Séverine Nébié (born 27 November 1982 in Burkina Faso) is a Burkinabé judoka who trains in France. She competed at the 2012 Summer Olympics in the Women -63kg event and lost in the second round. She was also the flag bearer for Burkina Faso at the opening ceremony. She also competes in ju-jitsu in which she won the world championship 2015 in Thailand.

After she won the silver medal at the women's 62 kg fighting during the World Games 2013 in Cali, competing for France, she even won the gold medal in the next edition in Wrocław in the -62 kg category.

References 

1982 births
Living people
Burkinabé female judoka
Judoka at the 2012 Summer Olympics
Olympic judoka of Burkina Faso
World Games silver medalists
African Games gold medalists for Burkina Faso
African Games medalists in judo
Competitors at the 2013 World Games
World Games gold medalists
Competitors at the 2011 All-Africa Games
Competitors at the 2017 World Games
21st-century Burkinabé people